Good Looking Records is a jungle and drum & bass record label, formed in 1991 by producer LTJ Bukem. The label specializes in jazz-influenced and atmospheric, so-called Intelligent Drum & Bass.

Overview 
The label releases music which includes 'spacey' synthesizers driven with elements of jazz and soul, although some releases have a darker amen break style to them. The label became synonymous for its musical style and science fiction-influenced record covers, which were a trademark of the label. Following the label's mid 2000s hiatus, all 12" singles issued were housed in a plain grey card sleeve with the label's logo on the front cover.

Some of the label's Drum & Bass releases went under the banner of Looking Good Records. These featured nearly identical sleeves, the only difference being the yellow spine of the Good Looking releases and the royal blue design of the Looking Good records.

Artists who have released on this label include LTJ Bukem, Blame, Photek, Blu Mar Ten, Seba, Source Direct, Makoto, Q Project, and Peshay.

History 
By 1990 the dance music genres of house and acid house had evolved into hardcore and breakbeat in the UK, with what was later referred to as "drum & bass" and "jungle" developing as offshoots. Initially mixing at raves, LTJ Bukem turned his hand to production, producing his first track "Demons Theme" in 1990. Bukem soon grew frustrated with the lack of control over his own recordings, so in 1991 he formed his own label Good Looking Records. Early Good Looking tracks like "Atlantis" and "Music" provided a soulful, melodic alternative to the prevailing hardcore tracks then in vogue.

By 1994, LTJ Bukem had formed his second label Looking Good Records and begun the formation of an artist collective including Peshay, Aquarius (aka Photek), Blu Mar Ten, Blame, Nookie & Tayla, — similarly inclined towards melodicism and epic expanses of sound. Bukem also launched the club night Speed at the Mars Bar in London, in order to promote Good Looking's approach to sound. With Bukem & Fabio playing breakbeat records and MC Conrad providing vocals, it soon became one of the most popular clubs in London.

In 1996 the release of Logical Progression signalled Good Looking's commitment to the drum & bass and jungle community providing shelter for a unique band of producers. The same year, Good Looking introduced the Earth series of compilations. The Earth series showcases a range of mid-tempo musical styles from hip-hop, lounge, cosmic funk, and future soul, jazz and house music. The most recent volume – Earth 7 featured a DVD with 5.1 DTS surround sound.

1998 saw the release of the first Progression Sessions mix CD. These live recordings capture the vibe of the Progression Sessions tours & residencies from around the world. Now in its 10th edition the Progression Sessions series documents the musical direction of Good Looking Records through the years and illustrates the live element brought to each event through the complementary pairing of LTJ Bukem's music and the vocals of MC Conrad.

Into the 2000s, Good Looking Records continued to release further Progression Sessions mix CDs, compilation CDs and vinyl. The latest wave of records were released in 2014.

See also
 Moving Shadow
 Metalheadz

References

External links
 Good Looking Records Discography.

British record labels
Record labels disestablished in 2005
Drum and bass record labels